This article presents the complete discography of the British art rock band 10cc.

Albums

Studio albums

Compilation albums

Live albums

Promotional and limited releases

Box sets

Singles

Other tracks

Collaborations

As featured artist

Videos

Video albums

As featured artist

Music videos

Notes

References

External links 
 The unofficial discography of 10cc

Rock music group discographies
Discographies of British artists
Discography